Fired Up is a studio album released by country music artist Dan Seals. It was released in 1994 under the Warner Bros. label. It produced two unsuccessful singles. The song, "Gentleman of Leisure" was written by Folk Rock musician, Jesse Winchester who would later record it for his 1999 album of the same name.

Track listing
 "All Fired Up" (Dennis Morgan, Steve Davis, Bobby Lee Springfield) - 2:35     
 "Love Thing" (Michael Jordan, Jim Weatherly) - 3:51     
 "A Rose from Another Garden" (Joe Doyle, Glen Davies) - 3:10     
 "Hillbilly Fever" (Doyle, Todd Wilkes) - 3:01     
 "When" (Robert Ellis Orrall, Giles Goddard) - 3:26     
 "Call Me Up" (Josh Leo, Harry Stinson) - 3:13 
 "Jayney" (Johnny Nestor) - 3:23     
 "A Good Place to Be" (Rory Michael Bourke, Charlie Black) - 3:33     
 "Gentleman of Leisure" (Jesse Winchester) - 4:13    
 "Still Reelin' (From Those Rock & Roll Days)" (Dan Seals, Allen Shamblin) - 5:23

Singles

References

Allcdcovers.com page for "All Fired Up"
CMT

Dan Seals albums
1994 albums
Warner Records albums
Albums produced by Jerry Crutchfield